The Boeing 757 is an American narrow-body airliner designed and built by Boeing Commercial Airplanes.

The then-named 7N7, a twinjet successor for the 727 (a trijet), received its first orders in August 1978.
The prototype completed its maiden flight on February 19, 1982 and it was FAA certified on December 21, 1982.
Eastern Air Lines placed the original  in commercial service on January 1, 1983.
A package freighter (PF) variant entered service in September 1987 and a combi model in September 1988.
The stretched  was launched in September 1996 and began service in March 1999. 
After 1,050 had been built for 54 customers, production ended in October 2004, while Boeing offered the largest 737 NG variants as a successor.

The jetliner is powered by 36,600–43,500 lbf (163–193 kN) Rolls-Royce RB211 or Pratt & Whitney PW2000 underwing turbofan engines for a  MTOW.
The 757 has a 2,000 sq ft (185 m2) supercritical wing for reduced aerodynamic drag and a conventional tail.
It keeps the 707 fuselage width and six abreast seating and its two-crew glass cockpit has a common type rating with the concurrently designed 767 (a wide-body aircraft).

The 757-200F can haul a 72,210 lb (32,755 kg) payload over 2,935 nmi (5,435 km).
Passenger  have been modified for cargo use as the Special Freighter (SF) and the Precision Converted Freighter (PCF).

Major customers for the 757 included U.S. mainline carriers, European charter airlines, and cargo companies.
It was commonly used for short and mid-range domestic routes, shuttle services, and transcontinental U.S. flights.
ETOPS extended flights were approved in 1986 to fly intercontinental routes.
Private and government operators have customized the 757 as VIP carriers such as the US C-32.
In July 2017, there were 665 Boeing 757 in commercial service, with Delta Air Lines being the largest operator with 127 airplanes in its fleet.

The airliner has recorded twelve hull-loss accidents, including eight fatal crashes, .

Development

Background
In the early 1970s, following the launch of the first wide-body airliner, the 747, Boeing began considering further developments of its narrow-body 727. Designed for short and medium length routes, the trijet was the best-selling jetliner of the 1960s and a mainstay of the U.S. domestic airline market. Studies focused on improving the 189-seat , the most successful variant. Two approaches were considered: a stretched 727 (to be designated 727-300), and an all-new aircraft code-named 7N7. The former was a cheaper derivative using the 727's existing technology and tail-mounted engine configuration, while the latter was a twin-engine aircraft which made use of new materials and improvements to propulsion technology which had become available in the civil aerospace industry.

United Airlines provided input for the proposed 727-300, which Boeing was poised to launch in late 1975, but lost interest after examining development studies for the 7N7. Instead, airlines were drawn to the high-bypass-ratio turbofan engines, new flight deck technologies, lower weight, improved aerodynamics, and reduced operating cost promised by the 7N7. These features were also included in a parallel development effort for a new mid-size wide-body airliner, code-named 7X7, which became the 767. Work on both proposals accelerated as a result of the airline industry upturn in the late 1970s.

New features included a redesigned wing, under-wing engines, and lighter materials, while the forward fuselage, cockpit layout, and T-tail configuration were retained from the 727. Boeing planned for the aircraft to offer the lowest fuel burn per passenger-kilometer of any narrow-body airliner. On August 31, 1978, Eastern Air Lines and British Airways became the first carriers to publicly commit to the 7N7 when they announced launch orders totaling 40 aircraft for the  version. These orders were signed in March 1979, when Boeing officially designated the aircraft as the 757. The shorter  did not receive any orders and was dropped; 737s later fulfilled its envisioned role.

Design effort
The 757 was intended to be more capable and more efficient than the preceding 727. The focus on fuel efficiency reflected airline concerns over operating costs, which had grown amid rising oil prices during the Yom Kippur War of 1973. Design targets included a 20 percent reduction in fuel consumption from new engines, plus 10 percent from aerodynamic improvements, versus preceding aircraft. Lighter materials and new wings were also expected to improve efficiency. The 757's higher thrust-to-weight ratio allowed it to take off from short runways and serve airports in hot and high conditions with higher ambient temperatures and thinner air, offering better takeoff performance than that offered by competing aircraft. Competitors needed longer takeoff runs for these hot and high conditions. Boeing also offered options for higher payload capability.

The twin-engine configuration was chosen for greater fuel efficiency versus three- and four-engine designs. This marked the first time that a Boeing airliner was launched with engines produced outside the U.S. Domestic manufacturer Pratt & Whitney subsequently offered the  thrust PW2037, which Delta Air Lines launched with an order for 60 aircraft in November 1980. General Electric also offered its  engine early in the program, but eventually abandoned its involvement due to insufficient demand.

As development progressed, the 757 increasingly departed from its 727 origins and adopted elements from the 767, which was several months ahead in development. To reduce risk and cost, Boeing combined design work on both twinjets, resulting in shared features such as interior fittings and handling characteristics. Computer-aided design, first applied on the 767, was used for over one-third of the 757's design drawings. In early 1979, a common two-crew member glass cockpit was adopted for the two aircraft, including shared instrumentation, avionics, and flight management systems. In October 1979 the nose was widened and dropped to reduce aerodynamic noise by six dB, to improve the flight deck view and to give more working area for the crew for greater commonality with the 767. Cathode-ray tube (CRT) color displays replaced conventional electromechanical instruments, with increased automation eliminating the flight engineer position common to three-person cockpits. After completing a short conversion course, pilots rated on the 757 could be qualified to fly the 767 and vice versa, owing to their design similarities.

A new aft-loaded shape which produced lift across most of the upper wing surface, instead of a narrow band as in previous airfoil designs, was used for the 757's wings. The more efficient wings had less drag and greater fuel capacity, and were similar in configuration to those on the 767. A wider wingspan than the 727's produced less lift-induced drag, while larger wing roots increased undercarriage storage space and provided room for future stretched versions of the aircraft.

One of the last 727 vestiges, the T-tail, was dropped in mid-1979 in favor of a conventional tail. This avoided the risk of an aerodynamic condition known as a deep stall, and allowed for more passengers to be carried in a less tapered rear fuselage. The fuselage cross-section, whose upper lobe was common to the 707 and 737, was the only major structural feature to be retained from the 727. This was mainly to reduce drag, and while a wider fuselage had been considered, Boeing's market research found low cargo capacity needs and reduced passenger preference for wide-body aircraft on short-haul routes.

Production and testing
Boeing built a final assembly line in Washington at its Renton factory, home of 707, 727, and 737 production, to produce the 757. Early in the development program, Boeing, British Airways, and Rolls-Royce unsuccessfully lobbied the British aircraft industry to manufacture 757 wings. Ultimately, about half of the aircraft's components, including the wings, nose section, and empennage, were produced in-house at Boeing facilities with the remainder subcontracted to primarily U.S.-based companies. Fairchild Aircraft made the leading edge slats, Grumman supplied the flaps, and Rockwell International produced the main fuselage. Production ramp-up for the new narrow-body airliner coincided with the winding-down of the 727 program, and final assembly of the first aircraft began in January 1981.

The prototype 757 rolled out of the Renton factory on January 13, 1982. The aircraft, equipped with  engines, completed its maiden flight one week ahead of schedule on February 19, 1982. The first flight was affected by an engine stall, following indications of low oil pressure. After checking system diagnostics, company test pilot John Armstrong and co-pilot Lew Wallick were able to restart the affected engine, and the flight proceeded normally thereafter. Subsequently, the 757 embarked on a seven-day weekly flight test schedule. By this time, the aircraft had received 136 orders from seven carriers, namely Air Florida, American Airlines, British Airways, Delta Air Lines, Eastern Air Lines, Monarch Airlines, and Transbrasil.

The seven-month 757 flight test program used the first five aircraft built. Tasks included flight systems and propulsion tests, hot and cold weather trials, and route-proving flights. Data from the 767 program helped expedite the process. After design issues were identified, the 757's exit doors received dual-spring mechanisms for easier operation, and the fuselage was strengthened for greater bird strike resistance. The production aircraft was  lighter than originally specified, and recorded a three percent better-than-expected rate of fuel burn. After 1,380 flight test hours, the RB211-powered 757 received U.S. Federal Aviation Administration (FAA) certification on December 21, 1982, followed by UK Civil Aviation Authority (CAA) certification on January 14, 1983. The first delivery to launch customer Eastern Air Lines occurred on December 22, 1982, about four months after the first 767 deliveries. The first 757 with PW2037 engines rolled out about one year later, and was delivered to Delta Air Lines on November 5, 1984.

Service entry and operations

Eastern Air Lines operated the first commercial 757 flight on January 1, 1983, on the Atlanta-to-Tampa route. On February 9, 1983, British Airways began using the aircraft for London-to-Belfast shuttle services, where it replaced Hawker Siddeley Trident 3B trijets. Charter carriers Monarch Airlines and Air Europe also began 757 operations later that year. Early operators noted improved reliability and quieter performance compared with previous jetliners. Transition courses eased pilots' introduction to the new CRT-based cockpit, and no major technical issues arose. Eastern Air Lines, the first 727 operator to take delivery of 757s, confirmed that the aircraft had greater payload capability than its predecessor, along with lower operating costs through improved fuel burn and the use of a two-crew member flight deck. Compared with the 707 and 727, the new twinjet consumed 42 and 40 percent less fuel per seat, respectively, on typical medium-haul flights.

Despite the successful debut, 757 sales remained stagnant for most of the 1980s, a consequence of declining fuel prices and a shift to smaller aircraft in the post-deregulation U.S. market. Although no direct competitor existed, 150-seat narrow-bodies such as the McDonnell Douglas MD-80 were less expensive and carried nearly as many passengers as some airlines' 757s. A three-year sales drought abated in November 1983 when Northwest Airlines placed orders for 20 aircraft, which averted a costly production rate decrease. The freighter model included a main deck cargo hold and entered service with UPS in September 1987. The combi model could carry both cargo and passengers on its main deck and entered service with Royal Nepal Airlines in September 1988.

In the late 1980s, increasing airline hub congestion and the onset of U.S. airport noise regulations fueled a turnaround in 757 sales. From 1988 to 1989, airlines placed 322 orders, including a combined 160 orders from American Airlines and United Airlines. By this time, the 757 had become commonplace on short-haul domestic flights and transcontinental services in the U.S., and had replaced aging 707s, 727s, Douglas DC-8s, and McDonnell Douglas DC-9s. The 757 was also flown out of airports with stringent noise regulations, such as John Wayne Airport in Orange County, California, and airports with aircraft size restrictions, such as Washington National Airport near downtown Washington, D.C. The largest U.S. operators, Delta Air Lines and American Airlines, would ultimately operate fleets of over 100 aircraft each.

In Europe, British Airways, Iberia, and Icelandair were the 757's largest mainline customers, while other carriers such as Lufthansa rejected the type as too large for their narrow-body aircraft needs. Many European charter airlines, including Air 2000, Air Holland, and LTU International, also acquired the twinjet for holiday and tour package flights in the late 1980s. In Asia, where even larger aircraft were commonly preferred because of greater passenger volumes, the 757 found fewer orders. A 1982 sales demonstration was unable to attract a purchase from potential customer Japan Airlines, and the first Asian customer, Singapore Airlines, sold its four 757s in 1989 in favor of standardizing on the 240-seat wide-body Airbus A310, just five years after debuting the type on Indonesian and Malaysian routes. The 757 fared better in China, where following an initial purchase by the CAAC Airlines in 1987, orders grew to 59 aircraft, making it the largest Asian market. Operators such as China Southern, China Southwest, Shanghai Airlines, Xiamen Airlines, and Xinjiang Airlines used the 757 on medium length domestic routes.

In 1986, the FAA approved RB211-powered 757s for extended-range twin-engine operational performance standards (ETOPS) operations over the North Atlantic, following precedents set by the 767. Under ETOPS regulations, a set of safety standards governing twinjet flights over oceans and other areas without nearby suitable landing sites, airlines began using the aircraft for mid-range intercontinental routes. Although the 757 was not originally intended for transoceanic flights, regulators based their decision on its reliable performance record on extended transcontinental U.S. services. ETOPS certification for 757s equipped with PW2000 series engines was granted in 1992.

In the early 1990s, the FAA and other U.S. government agencies, including the National Aeronautics and Space Administration (NASA) and the National Transportation Safety Board (NTSB), began studying the 757's wake turbulence characteristics. This followed several incidents, including two fatal crashes, in which small private aircraft experienced loss of control when flying close behind the twinjet. Smaller airliners had also suffered unexpected rolling movements when flying behind 757s. Investigators focused on the aircraft's aft-loaded wing design, which at certain points during takeoff or landing could produce wingtip vortices that were stronger than those emanating from larger 767s and 747s. Other tests were inconclusive, leading to debate among government agencies, and in 1994 and 1996 the FAA updated air traffic control regulations to require greater separation behind the 757 than other large-category jets. The 757 became the only sub- airliner to be classified as a "heavy" jet, alongside wide-body aircraft, under FAA separation rules.

Stretched variant
Production of the 757 peaked at an annual rate of 100 aircraft in the early 1990s, during which time upgraded models came under consideration. For over a decade, the narrow-body twinjet had been its manufacturer's only single-aisle airliner without a stretched variant, and while rumors of a long-range  and stretched  persisted, no formal announcements had been made. European charter carriers were particularly interested in a higher-capacity version which could take better advantage of the 757's range.

In September 1996, following a launch order for 12 aircraft from charter carrier Condor, Boeing announced the stretched  at the Farnborough Airshow. The type's design phase was intended to be the shortest in its manufacturer's history, with 27 months from launch to certification. Due to development and cost concerns, radical upgrades such as a Next Generation 737-style advanced cockpit were not implemented. Instead, the stretched derivative received upgraded engines, enhanced avionics, and a redesigned interior. The first  rolled out on May 31, 1998, and completed its maiden flight on August 2, 1998. Following regulatory certification in January 1999, the type entered service with Condor on March 19, 1999.

The 757-300 was also ordered by American Trans Air, Arkia Israel Airlines, Continental Airlines, Icelandair, and Northwest Airlines. Sales for the type remained slow, and ultimately totaled 55 aircraft. Overtures to other charter airlines also did not result in further orders.

Further developments
While the 757 program had been financially successful, declining sales in the early 2000s threatened its continued viability. Airlines were again gravitating toward smaller aircraft, now mainly the 737 and A320, because of their reduced financial risk. An airline industry downturn and the large number of relatively young 757s already in service also reduced customer demand. In 2000, spurred by interest from Air 2000 and Continental Airlines, Boeing reexamined the possibility of building a longer-range . However, the proposal failed to garner any orders. In March 2001, Boeing delivered the first , a second-hand  converted for freighter use, to DHL Aviation. The  marked the manufacturer's first foray into passenger-to-freighter conversions.

The 1,050th and last example, a  built for Shanghai Airlines, rolled off the production line at the Renton factory on October 28, 2004, and was delivered on November 28, 2005, after several months of storage. With the conclusion of the 757 program, Boeing consolidated 737 assembly at its Renton factory, downsizing its facilities by 40 percent and shifting staff to different locations.

Since the end of production, most 757s have remained in service, mainly in the U.S. From 2004 to 2008, the average fuel cost for typical mid-range U.S. domestic 757 flights tripled, putting pressure on airlines to improve the fuel efficiency of their fleets. The winglets improve fuel efficiency by five percent and increase range by  through the reduction of lift-induced drag.

Prior to the United-Continental merger in 2010, the 757 remained the only narrow-body aircraft in use by the large fleets of all three U.S. legacy carriers: American Airlines, Delta Air Lines and United Airlines. The Tupolev Tu-204, a narrow-body twinjet introduced in 1989 with a design similar to the 757's, is offered in a 200-seat version, which has seen limited production for mainly Russian customers. Within Boeing, the 215-seat,  range 737-900ER has been regarded as the closest aircraft in production to the 757-200.

Replacement aircraft

In February 2015, Boeing marketing Vice President Randy Tinseth stated that re-engining the 757 had been studied but there was no business case to support it. At the March 2015 ISTAT conference, Air Lease Corporation's Steven Udvar-Hazy predicted the 757 replacement would be a more capable, clean-sheet 767-like twin-aisle airplane capable of taking off from  runways like New York LaGuardia, and Tinseth was focused on 20% more range and more capacity than the 757-200.

In May 2020, due to the ongoing 737 MAX issues and the economic crisis caused by the COVID-19 pandemic, Boeing set aside the clean-sheet design for the New Midsize Airplane (NMA) and began to look into a re-engined 757, dubbed the 757-Plus, which would compete with the Airbus A321XLR. The 757-Plus would need new engines, better efficiency, greater range, and more passenger capacity in order to satisfy the market that the NMA would have filled.

Design

Overview

The 757 is a low-wing cantilever monoplane with a conventional tail unit featuring a single fin and rudder. Each wing features a supercritical cross-section and is equipped with five-panel leading edge slats, single- and double-slotted flaps, an outboard aileron, and six spoilers. The wings are largely identical across all 757 variants, swept at 25 degrees, and optimized for a cruising speed of Mach 0.8. The reduced wing sweep eliminates the need for inboard ailerons, yet incurs little drag penalty on short and medium length routes, during which most of the flight is spent climbing or descending.

To distribute the aircraft's weight on the ground, the 757 has a retractable tricycle landing gear with four wheels on each main gear and two for the nose gear. The landing gear was purposely designed to be taller than the company's previous narrow-body aircraft to provide ground clearance for stretched models. In 1982, the  became the first subsonic jetliner to offer longer lasting carbon brakes as a factory option, supplied by Dunlop. The stretched  features a retractable tailskid on its aft fuselage to prevent damage if the tail section contacts the runway surface during takeoff.

Besides common avionics and computer systems, the 757 shares its auxiliary power unit, electric power systems, flight deck, and hydraulic parts with the 767. Through operational commonality, 757 pilots can obtain a common type rating to fly the 767 and share the same seniority roster with pilots of either aircraft. This reduces costs for airlines that operate both twinjets.

Flight systems

The 757's flight deck uses six Rockwell Collins CRT screens to display flight instrumentation, as well as an electronic flight instrument system (EFIS) and an engine indication and crew alerting system (EICAS). These systems allow the pilots to handle monitoring tasks previously performed by the flight engineer. An enhanced flight management system, improved over versions used on early 747s, automates navigation and other functions, while an automatic landing system facilitates CAT IIIb instrument landings in  low visibility conditions.

To accommodate the same flight deck design as the 767, the 757 has a more rounded nose section than previous narrow-body aircraft. The resulting space has unobstructed panel visibility and room for an observer seat. Similar pilot viewing angles as the 767 result from a downward sloped cockpit floor and the same forward cockpit windows.

Three independent hydraulic systems are installed on the 757, one powered by each engine, and the third using electric pumps. A ram air turbine is fitted to provide power for essential controls in the event of an emergency. A basic form of fly-by-wire facilitates spoiler operation, utilizing electric signaling instead of traditional control cables. The fly-by-wire system, shared with the 767, reduces weight and provides for the independent operation of individual spoilers. When equipped for extended-range operations, the 757 features a backup hydraulic motor generator and an additional cooling fan in the aircraft's electronics bay.

Interior

The 757 interior allows seat arrangements of up to six per row with a single center aisle. Originally optimized for flights averaging two hours, the 757 features interior lighting and cabin architecture designs aimed at a more spacious impression. As on the 767, garment-bag-length overhead bins and a rear economy-class galley are standard equipment. The bins have twice the capacity as those on the preceding 727. To save weight, honeycomb sandwich is used for interior paneling and bins. Unlike previous evacuation slide designs which are not equipped for water landings, the 757's main exits feature combination slide rafts similar to those found on the 747. In the 1980s, Boeing altered the interior designs of its other narrow-body aircraft to be similar to that of the 757.

In 1998, the 757-300 debuted a redesigned interior derived from the Next Generation 737 and 777, including sculptured ceiling panels, indirect lighting, and larger overhead bins with an optional continuous handrail built into their base for the entire cabin length. Centerline storage containers mounted in the aisle ceiling for additional escape rafts and other emergency equipment were also added. The 757-300's interior later became an option on all new . In 2000, with wheeled carry-on baggage becoming more popular, Delta Air Lines began installing overhead bin extensions on their  to provide additional storage space, and American Airlines did the same in 2001. The larger bins are part of aftermarket interior upgrades which include updated ceiling panels and lighting.

Variants

The 757 was produced in standard and stretched lengths. The original 757-200 debuted as a passenger model, and was subsequently developed into the 757-200PF and 757-200SF cargo models, as well as the convertible 757-200M variant. The stretched 757-300 was only available as a passenger model. When referring to different versions, Boeing, and airlines are known to collapse the model number (757) and the variant designator (e.g.  or ) into a truncated form (e.g. "752" or "753").

757-200

The 757-200, the original version of the aircraft, entered service with Eastern Air Lines in 1983. The type was produced with two different exit configurations, both with three standard cabin doors per side: the baseline version has a fourth, smaller cabin door on each side aft of the wings, and is certified for a maximum capacity of 239, while the alternate version has a pair of over-the-wing emergency exits on each side, and can seat a maximum of 224. Similarly, versions with winglets are sometimes called "757-200W" or "757-200WL". The first engine to power the 757-200, the Rolls-Royce RB211-535C, was succeeded by the upgraded RB211-535E4 in October 1984. Other engines used include the Rolls-Royce RB211-535E4B, along with the Pratt & Whitney PW2037 and PW2040.

Although designed for short and medium length routes, the 757-200 has since been used in a variety of roles ranging from high-frequency shuttle services to transatlantic routes. In 1992, after gaining ETOPS approval, American Trans Air launched 757-200 transpacific services between Tucson and Honolulu. Since the turn of the century, mainline U.S. carriers have increasingly deployed the type on transatlantic routes to Europe, and particularly to smaller cities where passenger volumes are insufficient for wide-body aircraft. Production for the 757-200 totaled 913 aircraft, making the type by far the most popular 757 model. United's 757s assigned to transatlantic routes are fitted with 169 seats. In July 2018, 611 of the 757-200 versions were in service.

757-200PF

The 757-200PF, the production cargo version of the 757-200, entered service with UPS Airlines in 1987. The maximum revenue payload capability is  including container weight. Because the freighter does not carry any passengers, it can operate transatlantic flights free of ETOPS restrictions. Power is provided by RB211-535E4B engines from Rolls-Royce, or PW2037 and PW2040 engines from Pratt & Whitney.

The freighter features a large, upward-opening main deck cargo door on its forward port-side fuselage. Next to this large cargo door is an exit door used by the pilots. All other emergency exits are omitted, and cabin windows and passenger amenities are not available. The main-deck cargo hold has a smooth fiberglass lining, and a fixed rigid barrier with a sliding access door serves as a restraint wall next to the flight deck. Both lower holds can be equipped with a telescoping baggage system to load custom-fitted cargo modules. When equipped for extended-range transatlantic operations, UPS's 757-200PFs feature an upgraded auxiliary power unit, additional cargo bay fire suppression equipment, enhanced avionics, and an optional supplemental fuel tank in the aft lower hold. Total production for the 757-200PF totaled 80 aircraft.

757-200M
The 757-200M, a convertible version capable of carrying cargo and passengers on its main deck, entered service with Royal Nepal Airlines in 1988. Also known as the 757-200 Combi, the type retains the passenger windows and cabin doors of the 757-200, while adding a forward port-side cargo door in the manner of the 757-200PF. Kathmandu-based Royal Nepal Airlines, later renamed Nepal Airlines, included the convertible model as part of an order for two 757s in 1986.

Nepal Airlines ordered the 757-200M to fulfill a requirement for an aircraft that could carry mixed passenger and freight loads, and operate out of Tribhuvan International Airport, with its  elevation, in the foothills of the Himalayas. Patterned after convertible variants of the 737 and 747, the 757-200M can carry two to four cargo pallets on its main deck, along with 123 to 148 passengers in the remaining cabin space.

In October 2010, Pemco World Air Services and Precision Conversions launched aftermarket conversion programs to modify 757-200s into 757 Combi aircraft. Vision Technologies Systems launched a similar program in December 2011. All three aftermarket conversions modify the forward portion of the aircraft to provide room for up to ten cargo pallets, while leaving the remaining space to fit around 45 to 58 passenger seats. This configuration is targeted at commercial charter flights which transport heavy equipment and personnel simultaneously. Customers for converted 757 Combi aircraft include the Air Transport Services Group, National Airlines, and North American Airlines.

In 2018, Nepal Airlines retired their sole Boeing 757-200M. They tried to sell it for a price of $7 million, then $5.4 million, then $4.2 million. The deal fell through and Nepal Airlines planned to keep it in service to maintain its value.

757-200 SF/PCF

The 757-200SF is a passenger to freighter conversion developed by Boeing following an order for 34 aircraft plus 10 options by DHL. It entered service in 2001 with the initial ex-British Airways aircraft converted at Boeing's Wichita site and subsequent blocks of aircraft converted by Israel Aerospace Industries and ST Aerospace Services.  Modifications included the removal of passenger amenities, main deck structural reinforcement, addition of cargo handling flooring and the installation of a 757-200PF port-side cargo door in the forward fuselage. The forward two entry doors and lobby area of the passenger aircraft are retained resulting in a main deck cargo capacity of 14 full sized pallets and one smaller LD3. Environmental controls can be fitted for animal cargo such as racehorses, and rear exits and window pairs are retained on some aircraft to facilitate animal handlers. ST Aerospace continue to offer 14, 14.5 and 15 Unit load device variants of the SF in 2020.

In September 2006, FedEx Express announced a US$2.6 billion plan to acquire over 80 converted 757 freighters to replace its 727 fleet citing a 25% reduction in operating cost along with noise benefits.

The 757-200PCF is a passenger to freighter conversion, developed by Precision Conversions and certificated in 2005. Reported in 2019 to cost $5 million per aircraft and similar to the SF it has 15 pallet positions.  External differences include the removal of the forward passenger style doors and their replacement with a -200PF style small crew door. Internally the main cargo door is not integrated with the base aircraft hydraulic and warning systems and instead operates from a self-contained hydraulic system though powered by the aircraft electrics.  By early 2020 a total of 120 757-200PCFs had been delivered.

757-300

The 757-300, the stretched version of the aircraft, entered service with Condor in 1999. Designed to serve the charter airline market and provide a low-cost replacement for the 767-200, the 757-300 shares the basic design of the original 757, while extending the fuselage forward and aft of the wings. Six standard cabin doors, two smaller cabin doors behind the wings, plus a pair of over-the-wing emergency exits on each side, enable the 757-300 to have a maximum certified capacity of 295 passengers. Engines used on the type include the RB211-535E4B from Rolls-Royce and the PW2043 from Pratt & Whitney. Due to its greater length, the 757-300 features a retractable tailskid on its aft fuselage to avoid tailstrikes.

Condor ordered the stretched 757 to replace its McDonnell Douglas DC-10s and serve as low-cost, high-density transportation to holiday destinations such as the Canary Islands. Because tests showed that boarding the 757-300 could take up to eight minutes longer than the 757-200, Boeing and Condor developed zone-based boarding procedures to expedite loading and unloading times for the lengthened aircraft. The 757-300 has been operated by mainline carriers Continental Airlines (now part of United Airlines), Northwest Airlines (now part of Delta Air Lines), and Icelandair; other operators have included American Trans Air (the first North American operator), Arkia Israel Airlines, along with charter carriers Condor and Thomas Cook Airlines as of 2014. Production for the 757-300 totaled 55 aircraft. All 55 were in service in July 2018.

Government, military, and corporate
Government, military, and private customers have acquired the 757 for uses ranging from aeronautical testing and research to cargo and VIP transport. The 757-200, the most widely ordered version of the aircraft, has formed the basis for these applications. The first government operator of the 757 was the Mexican Air Force, which took delivery of a VIP-configured 757-200 in November 1987.

 Airborne Research Integrated Experiments System (ARIES), a NASA platform for air safety and operational research, was created in 1999 using the second production 757. The aircraft originally flew in the 757 flight test program before entering service with Eastern Air Lines. After NASA purchased the aircraft in 1994 to replace its 737-100 testbed, it was initially used to evaluate a hybrid laminar flow control system, avionics systems for the proposed Northrop YF-23 jet fighter, and the 777's fly-by-wire control system. Equipped with a flight deck research station, on-board laboratories, and two experimental flight decks, ARIES was used for evaluating weather information and landing approach systems, as well as runway friction tests. ARIES went into storage in 2006.

C-32 – The United States Air Force operates six 757-200s under the designation C-32. Four are VIP-configured C-32A variants, whose mission is primarily transport of the Vice President of the United States, First Lady, and Secretary of State. The C-32As are powered by the Pratt & Whitney PW2000, and outfitted with a communication center, conference room, seating area, and private living quarters. The USAF also operates two 45-seat Rolls-Royce powered 757-200 aircraft, designated C-32B Gatekeeper, which provides airlift to special operations units and global emergency response teams. The C-32Bs are outfitted for any contingency, with an advanced communications suite, aerial refueling capabilities, extended fuel tanks, and an internal airstair. The C-32As are painted in the Raymond Loewy-designed blue and white livery used on most Special Air Mission aircraft, while the C-32Bs are painted gloss white with minimal identification markings. The first C-32s were acquired in 1998 and replaced C-137 Stratoliner transports.

 F-22 Flying Testbed – the first 757 built was used in 1998 as a testbed for Lockheed Martin F-22 Raptor avionics and sensor integration. The Boeing-owned aircraft was fitted with a canard above its cockpit to simulate the jet fighter's wing sensor layout, along with a forward F-22 fuselage section with radar and other systems, and a 30-seat laboratory with communication, electronic warfare, identification, and navigation sensors.
 Krueger flap and Natural Laminar Flow Insect Mitigation Test Program – as part of their ecoDemonstrator program, Boeing commenced a series of test flights on March 17, 2015 with a modified Boeing 757, incorporating new wing-leading-edge sections and an actively blown vertical tail. The left wing was modified to include a 6.7 m-span glove section supporting a variable-camber Krueger flap to be deployed during landing which protrudes just ahead of the leading edge. Although Krueger flaps have been tried before as insect-mitigation screens, previous designs caused additional drag; the newer design is variable-camber and designed to retract as seamlessly as possible into the lower wing surface. Increasing the use of natural laminar flow (NLF) on an aircraft wing has the potential to improve fuel burn by as much as 15%, but even small contaminants from insect remains will trip the flow from laminar to turbulent, destroying the performance benefit. The test flights have been supported by the European airline group TUI AG and conducted jointly with NASA as part of the agency's Environmentally Responsible Aviation (ERA) program. While the left wing tests the Kreuger flaps, the right wing is being used to test coatings that prevent insects from adhering to the wing.
 Active Flow Control System – On one aircraft Boeing has mounted 31 active flow jets mounted ahead of the rudder's leading edge. They receive air from the Auxiliary Power Unit (APU). Their purpose is to recover air flow that has separated from the rudder and redirect it to the rudder so that the rudder regains effectiveness, even at high deflection angles. This ensures an even air supply at all times.

 Royal New Zealand Air Force 757 Combi – the Royal New Zealand Air Force (RNZAF) operates two 757s converted to 757-200M standard by ST Aerospace Services for delivering equipment, medical evacuation, troop movements, and VIP transport. A cargo door, upgraded auxiliary power unit, enhanced communications systems, and retractable airstairs are fitted. The two aircraft, which replaced two 727-100QCs, have carried the Prime Minister of New Zealand, and flown to the ice-covered Pegasus Field near New Zealand's Scott Base in McMurdo Sound, Antarctica.
 VIP transport – the 757-200 serves as VIP transports for the President of Argentina under the Presidential Air Group serial Tango 01 and for the President of Mexico under the Mexican Air Force call sign TP01 or Transporte Presidencial 1. A Royal Brunei Airlines 757-200 was used by the Sultan of Brunei in the 1980s before being sold to the Government of Kazakhstan in 1995. The royal family of Saudi Arabia uses a 757-200 as a flying hospital. Microsoft co-founder Paul Allen used a private 757 from 2005 until 2011; the aircraft was then sold to Donald Trump and became known as "Trump Force One" during his 2016 U.S. presidential campaign.
 Excalibur – a testbed for the British BAE Systems Tempest's avionics and sensors. The aircraft is to be converted from a civilian airliner by 2Excel.

Proposed
 757-100 - A 150-seat, short fuselage version intended to offer similar capacity to a 727-200 but with greater range. Both the 757-100 and -200 were announced at the product launch on 31 August 1978, however the large wing and landing gear common with the 757-200 were found to be excessively heavy for an aircraft of that capacity. Planning for the 757-100 was discontinued in March 1979.

Operators

The largest 757 operators are Delta Air Lines, FedEx Express and United Airlines; Delta Air Lines is the largest overall, with a 757 fleet of 127 aircraft . American Airlines' 757 fleet of 142 aircraft was the largest until 2007, when the carrier retired Pratt & Whitney PW2000-powered models originating from its TWA acquisition to have an all Rolls-Royce RB211-powered 757 fleet. Delta subsequently acquired 17 former TWA/American Airlines 757s, and in October 2008, gained 45 more 757s from its acquisition of Northwest Airlines.

The cargo carrier with the most 757s is FedEx Express, which operated a 757-200F fleet of 111 aircraft in July 2018. UPS Airlines operate a further 75 of the type, with DHL Aviation and its affiliated companies, DHL Air UK, DHL Latin America, European Air Transport Leipzig, and Blue Dart Aviation, combined operating 35 cargo 757s of various types in 2018.

Joint launch customer British Airways operated the 757-200 for 27 years before retiring the type in November 2010. To celebrate the fleet's retirement, the airline unveiled one of its last three 757-200s in a retro style livery on October 4, 2010, matching the color scheme that it introduced the aircraft into service with in 1983. Subsequently, the type remained in operation with the company's subsidiary, OpenSkies.

Over the duration of the program, 1,050 Boeing 757s were built with 1,049 aircraft delivered. The prototype 757 remained with the manufacturer for testing purposes. In August 2020, a total of 642 Boeing 757 aircraft of all variants were in commercial service with operators Delta Air Lines (127), FedEx Express (107), UPS Airlines (75), United Airlines (72), Icelandair (27) and others with fewer aircraft of the type.

Orders and deliveries

Boeing 757 orders and deliveries (cumulative, by year):

 
 Data from Boeing, through the end of production

Model summary

 Data from Boeing, through the end of production

Accidents and incidents
, the 757 has been involved in 40 aviation occurrences, including 12  hull-loss accidents. Nine incidents and 12 hijackings have resulted in a total of  occupant fatalities. The first fatal event involving the aircraft occurred on October 2, 1990, when a hijacked Xiamen Airlines 737 collided with a China Southern Airlines 757 on the runways of Guangzhou Baiyun International Airport, China, killing 46 of the 122 people on board. Two 757-200s were hijacked on September 11, 2001 during a coordinated terrorist attack in the United States; hijackers crashed American Airlines Flight 77 into the Pentagon in Arlington, Virginia, killing all 64 on board and 125 on the ground, and United Airlines Flight 93 was also hijacked, and crashed near Shanksville, Pennsylvania, killing all 44 on board.

Accidents involving pilot error include American Airlines Flight 965, which crashed into a mountain in Buga, Colombia, on December 20, 1995, killing 151 passengers and eight crew members with four survivors, and the mid-air collision of DHL Flight 611 near Überlingen, Baden-Württemberg, Germany, on July 1, 2002, with the loss of the two people on board plus 69 on a Bashkirian Airlines Tupolev Tu-154. The American Airlines Flight 965 crash was blamed on navigational errors by the crew, while the collision of DHL Flight 611 involved air traffic control errors, but was mainly blamed on the Tupolev's crew not following a TCAS resolution advisory. Accidents attributed to spatial disorientation due to improperly maintained instruments include Birgenair Flight 301 on February 6, 1996, which crashed into the ocean near Puerto Plata, Dominican Republic, with the loss of all 189 passengers and crew, and Aeroperú Flight 603 on October 2, 1996, which crashed into the ocean off the coast of Pasamayo, Peru, with the loss of all 70 on board. In the Birgenair accident, investigators found that the aircraft had been stored without the necessary covers for its pitot tube sensors, thus allowing insects and debris to collect within, while in the Aeroperú accident, protective tape covering static vent sensors had not been removed.

Two private aircraft crashes were blamed on wake turbulence emanating from 757s. On December 18, 1992, a Cessna Citation crashed near Billings Logan International Airport in Montana, killing all six aboard, and on December 15, 1993, an IAI Westwind crashed near John Wayne Airport in California, killing all five aboard. Both airplanes had been flying less than  behind a 757.

On September 14, 1999, Britannia Airways Flight 226A crash landed near Girona-Costa Brava Airport, Spain, during a thunderstorm; the 757's fuselage broke into several pieces. The 245 occupants evacuated successfully, with 40 requiring hospital treatment. After investigating the incident, the FAA ordered all 757 operators in the U.S. to regularly inspect upper fuselage sections of their aircraft for structural fatigue.

On April 7, 2022, a DHL Boeing 757 aircraft operating Flight 7216 crash landed at San Jose, Costa Rica after attempting an emergency landing due to a hydraulic failure. Both crew members survived without injuries, the incident is under investigation.

Aircraft on display

A Delta Air Lines 757-200, registered as N608DA, is on display at the Delta Flight Museum in Atlanta, Georgia. The aircraft was the sixty-fourth example built. Prior to being moved to its permanent location, the aircraft was repainted into Delta's 'Widget' livery, the livery it wore when it was originally delivered; it is now on static display at the museum entrance.

Specifications

See also

References

Notes

Bibliography

Further reading

External links

 
 
 
 
 
 
 

 
757
1980s United States airliners
1980s United States cargo aircraft
Twinjets
Aircraft first flown in 1982
Low-wing aircraft